Ultrasawt is an Arabic media network founded in 2015. It publishes content in Arabic curated from a pool of journalists and writers from different Arab countries. The website describes itself as "a news media project that seeks to provide a comprehensive digital space for discussing various issues of interest to Arab audiences, with a commitment to providing the necessary context to the latest news, while keeping up with the utmost standards of professional media values and practices". Additionally, more than 1000 writers and translators contributed to the website since it was launched.

Ultrasawt published several local sub-sites targeting local Arab audiences in specific countries, such as Palestine, Tunisia, Sudan, Algeria, and Iraq.

Censorship
The website has been banned in several Arab countries, including Egypt, UAE, Saudi Arabia, and lately in the Palestinian territories. The Palestinian authorities blocked the website and 58 other websites, claiming that they publish images and media that "threaten national security and civil peace, disturb public order and morals and inflame Palestinian public opinion". The Committee to Protect Journalists (CPJ) issued a statement condemning blocking the website, and accusing the authorities of "denying Palestinians their right to receive information from a variety of sources". The move to block the websites was also condemned by Reporters Without Borders.

References

External links 

Arabic-language websites
Palestinian news websites
Tunisian news websites
Sudanese news websites
Algerian news websites
Iraqi news websites
Technology websites
Internet properties established in 2015